Seaford School District is a public school district situated in Sussex County in southern Delaware.  The district encompasses a six-mile radius from the center of Seaford, and serves more than 3,400 students.

Its attendance area includes Seaford, Blades, a small portion of Bridgeville, and their outlying neighborhoods, as well as Concord, Middleford, and Woodland.

Schools
High schools
Seaford High School

Middle schools
Seaford Middle School

Elementary schools
Blades Elementary School
Douglass (Frederick) Elementary School
Seaford Central Elementary School
West Seaford Elementary School

References

External links
Seaford School District

School districts in Sussex County, Delaware